The Prophecy is a Mauritian seggae music band created in 2015 by Murvin Clélie (voice) and Olivier Dauphine (guitar).

References

Reggae genres
Music of Réunion
Mauritian music
Seychellois music